Grand Bahama International Airport (GBIA)  is an international airport in Freeport, Bahamas. It was privately owned until the government of the Bahamas purchased it in April 2021. 

The airport was a joint venture between Hutchison Port Holdings (HPH) and The Port Group (or the Grand Bahama Port Authority). The facility also includes  of land that adjoins it to the Freeport Harbour Company Limited as they operate as one entity, known as the Sea Air Business Centre (SABC).

Facilities
The airport has a  runway which is capable of handling the largest aircraft in service and is relatively close to all major cities of the Eastern Seaboard of the United States.

Some other features that are available at the Grand Bahama International Airport are:

 VOR system
 PAPI (Precision approach path indicator) system
 Distance-remaining markers
 Category seven fire fighting facilities
 General aviation services
 Air conditioned passenger terminal (Set temp: 28 degrees C)

Airlines and destinations

Passenger

Cargo

Accidents and incidents
On 12 November 1964, Lockheed Lodestar N171Q stalled after take-off and was destroyed by fire in the subsequent crash, killing all four people on board.
On 24 November 1979, Convair 440-86 N444JM of Mackey International Airlines was on an international non-scheduled passenger flight to Fort Lauderdale International Airport when the starboard engine caught fire just after take-off. On approach to Grand Bahamas International, the engine fell off. On landing, the aircraft departed the runway and ended up in the sea. All 46 people on board escaped from the aircraft.
All 34 on board were killed.
On 20 July 2000, Douglas C-47A N54AA of Allied Air Freight suffered an engine failure on take-off from Grand Bahama International Airport on a cargo flight to Nassau International Airport, Bahamas. The aircraft crashed while attempting to return to Grand Bahama International and was destroyed. Both crew were killed.
On 9 November 2014, a Lear 36 Executive Jet crashed on approach to the airport. All nine people on board perished, including evangelist Myles Munroe and his wife.
On  7 February 2017, a Western Air Saab 340 passenger aircraft landing gear failed shortly after takeoff. The aircraft turned around and crashed landed at the airport. All 30 passengers survived and 2 sustained minor injuries.
From September 1–3, 2019, the airport was pelted by Hurricane Dorian, leaving the airport  under six feet of water and heavily damaged.
On 24 October 2020, An American Eagle ERJ-145LR (N674RJ) operating as Envoy Air Flight 4194 from Miami to Freeport had a runway excursion upon landing. Nobody was injured in the crash. The aircraft had suffered main gear damage, and the left main broke off.

References 

Airports in the Bahamas
Airports with United States border preclearance
Buildings and structures in Freeport, Bahamas